
Nowy Dwór County is a unit of territorial administration and local government (powiat) in Masovian Voivodeship, east-central Poland. It came into being on January 1, 1999, as a result of the Polish local government reforms passed in 1998. Warsaw-Modlin Airport is located within the county.
As of 2019, its total population is 79,256, out of which the population of Nowy Dwór Mazowiecki is 28,649, that of Nasielsk is 7,702, that of Zakroczym is 3,196, and the rural population is 39,709.

Neighbouring counties
Nowy Dwór County is bordered by Pułtusk County to the north-east, Legionowo County to the east, Warsaw West County to the south, Sochaczew County to the south-west and Płońsk County to the north-west.

Administrative division
The county is subdivided into six gminas (one urban, two urban-rural and three rural). These are listed in the following table, in descending order of population.

References

 
Land counties of Masovian Voivodeship